Kumar Mohalla is a part of Akingam village in Anantnag district of Jammu and Kashmir and a part of tehsil Akingam. It enroutes Kashmir's best-known tourist resorts such as Achabal, Kokernag and Daksum.
On one side of Kumar Mohalla Akingam there is a craft centre. 
Kumar Mohalla Akingam is known for earthenware.

Demographics
Kumar Mohalla is very populous mohalla and constitutes about a quarter of total population of Akingam.

See also
 :Shiva Bhagwati Temple Akingam

References

Akingam
Villages in Anantnag district